Khajoor Pe Atke() is a comedy film written and directed by Harsh Chhaya, who makes his directorial debut. Starring Manoj Pahwa, Vinay Pathak, Dolly Ahluwalia, Seema Pahwa, Sanah Kapoor, Suneeta Sengupta, produced by Welcome Friends Productions, and presented by S.O.I.E., the film hits cinemas nationwide on 18 May and is distributed by PVR Pictures with music on Zee Music.

Cast
 Manoj Pahwa as Jeetendar
 Vinay Pathak as Ravindar
 Seema Pahwa as Sushila
 Dolly Ahluwalia as Lalita
 Sanah Kapur as Nayantara
 Nabeel Ahmed as Amit (Nayantara's brother) 
 Vandita Shrivastava as Bar Dancer
 Prathamesh Parab as Rocky
 Suneeta Sengupta as Anuradha
 Alka Amin as Kadambari
 Vicky Arora as Alok
 Boman Irani as Abhishek

Soundtrack

All the songs of the movie and the background music for the same has been composed by Bickram Ghosh from Kolkata and lyrics are penned by Kumaar and the director Harsh Chhaya himself (who has also sung the song "Dhokha" in the movie. The complete soundtrack is available on Zee Music.

Track listing

References

External links
 

2018 comedy films
Indian comedy films
2010s Hindi-language films